Garrett Keast (born 6 December 1971 in Houston) is an American conductor and founder of the Berlin Academy of American Music (BAAM).

Biography 
After studying in New York City Keast worked as associate conductor of the New York City Opera and later as assistant conductor at the Opéra National de Paris, Wiener Staatsoper and Deutsche Oper Berlin. He is a guest conductor for the Hamburg Ballet under John Neumeier.

He worked with sixty symphony orchestras and more than twenty opera companies, amongst them Deutsches Symphonie-Orchester Berlin, SWR Symphonieorchester, das Philharmonisches Staatsorchester Hamburg, Bamberger Symphoniker, Orchestre de Paris, Orchestre Philharmonique de Strasbourg, Royal Danish Orchestra, City of Prague Philharmonic Orchestra, Wiener Tonkünstler-Orchester, Rundfunk-Sinfonieorchester Berlin, Philharmonisches Staatsorchester Hamburg and Staatsphilharmonie Rheinland-Pfalz.

Berlin Academy of American Music 
In 2021 Keast founded the chamber orchestra Berlin Academy of American Music (BAAM) for orchestra works with a strong connection to North America. An album called Transatlantic was recorded at Teldex Studio in Berlin and published by Onyx in London in October 2021. It contains works of Aaron Copland, Avner Dorman, Igor Stravinsky, Craig Urquhart and Toru Takemitsu. Soloists were Stathis Karapanos und Chen Reiss. Reviews were published in Fanfare Magazine, Das Orchester and the BBC Music Magazine amongst others.

References

External links 
garrettkeast.com
Berlin Academy of American Music

Musicians from Houston
American male conductors (music)
Living people
1971 births